The 1957 Walker Cup, the 16th Walker Cup Match, was played on August 30 and 31, 1957, at the Minikahda Club, Minneapolis, Minnesota. The United States won by 8 matches to 3 with one match halved.

Format
Four 36-hole matches of foursomes were played on Friday and eight singles matches on Saturday. Each of the 12 matches was worth one point in the larger team competition. If a match was all square after the 36th hole extra holes were not played. The team with most points won the competition. If the two teams were tied, the previous winner would retain the trophy.

Teams
Ten players for the United States and Great Britain & Ireland participated in the event plus one non-playing captain for each team. Michael Bonallack was in the Great Britain & Ireland team but was not selected for any matches.

United States

Captain: Charles Coe
Rex Baxter
Arnold Blum
Joe Campbell
William C. Campbell
Bill Hyndman
Chuck Kocsis
Billy Joe Patton
Hillman Robbins
Mason Rudolph
Bud Taylor

Great Britain & Ireland
 & 
Captain:  Gerald Micklem
 Michael Bonallack
 Alan Bussell
 Joe Carr
 Frank Deighton
 Reid Jack
 Philip Scrutton
 Doug Sewell
 Alec Shepperson
 Alan Thirlwell
 Guy Wolstenholme

Friday's foursomes

Saturday's singles

References

Walker Cup
Golf in Minnesota
Walker Cup
Walker Cup
Walker Cup